Ahmed Lutfi Shihad (born 1956) is an Iraqi wrestler. He competed in the men's Greco-Roman 74 kg at the 1980 Summer Olympics.

References

1956 births
Living people
Iraqi male sport wrestlers
Olympic wrestlers of Iraq
Wrestlers at the 1980 Summer Olympics
Place of birth missing (living people)
Wrestlers at the 1986 Asian Games
Asian Games competitors for Iraq